Raceland is an unincorporated community and census-designated place (CDP) on Bayou Lafourche in Lafourche Parish, Louisiana, United States. The population was 9,768 in 2020. It is part of the Houma–Bayou Cane–Thibodaux metropolitan statistical area.

According to the Louisiana Office of Tourism, Raceland was named for the Race family that once owned a large plantation named "Raceland" on Bayou Lafourche.

Geography
Raceland is located at  (29.722576, -90.605172), on both sides of Bayou Lafourche. It is bordered to the southeast by Mathews.

U.S. Route 90 passes through the southeast part of Raceland, leading northeast  to New Orleans and west  to Morgan City. Louisiana Highways 1 and 308 pass through the center of Raceland, on the south and the north sides of Bayou Lafourche, respectively. Both highways lead southeast (downriver)  to Lockport and northwest (upriver)  to Thibodaux, the parish seat. Louisiana Highway 182 passes through the center of Raceland on the old route of US-90; it leads northeast  to US-90 and southwest  to Houma.

Demographics

As of the 2020 United States census, there were 9,768 people, 3,971 households, and 2,812 families residing in the CDP.

Government and infrastructure
The U.S. Postal Service operates the Raceland Post Office.

Education
Lafourche Parish Public Schools operates public schools.
 Raceland Lower Elementary School
 Raceland Upper Elementary School
 Raceland Middle School

Central Lafourche High School is in Mathews, and has a Raceland postal address. The school serves all of Raceland.

Raceland High School opened in 1912 and was expanded in 1924; it was consolidated into Lafourche Central High along with Lockport High School in 1966. An elementary school occupies the former Raceland High. In the era before desegregation (circa 1969) Raceland Colored School educated black residents.

Lafourche Parish Library operates the Raceland Branch.

Notable people
Gypsy Rose Blanchard, notable true crime personality; born in Raceland.
Donald G. Bollinger, founder of Bollinger Shipyards (1946) and state chairman of the Republican Party of Louisiana (1986–1988); born and died in Raceland, resided as an adult in Lockport
Jimmy Clanton, singer and actor; born in Raceland
Ron Estay, football player, All-American defensive lineman for LSU; played professionally for the Canadian Football League's Edmonton Eskimos
Freddie John Falgout, widely believed to be the first American killed in what would become known as World War II
Aaron Loup, pitcher for the Los Angeles Angels
Punch Miller, jazz musician; born in Raceland
Larry Wilson, basketball player and NBA draft pick

References

External links

 Raceland Middle School
 Raceland Upper Elementary School
 Raceland Lower Elementary School

Census-designated places in Lafourche Parish, Louisiana
Census-designated places in Louisiana
Census-designated places in Houma – Thibodaux metropolitan area